The Fall of Troy may refer to:
 Trojan War
 The Fall of Troy (book), a book written by Quintus Smyrnaeus in the 4th century about the Trojan War
 The Fall of Troy (band), an American post-hardcore band
 The Fall of Troy (album), debut self-titled album by The Fall of Troy
 The Fall of Troy (film), Italian film